Rev Fr Eduardo Pardo Hontiveros, SJ   (20 December 1923 – 15 January 2008), also known as "Fr. Honti", was a Filipino Jesuit composer and musician, best known as an innovative hymnwriter behind popular Philippine liturgical music.

Biography
He was born in Molo, Iloilo City, one of eight siblings, to José Hontiveros and Vicenta Pardo. He studied at the Capiz Elementary School and transferred to Ateneo de Manila High School, graduating in 1939. He entered the San José Seminary from 1939 to 1945, and entered the Society of Jesus in 1945; he professed his simple vows in 1947. He studied theology in the United States in 1951, and was ordained a priest by Cardinal Francis Spellman in 1954.

With the Vatican II mandate of localisation of the Mass, Fr. Honti began to write liturgical hymns in the 1960s. He wrote his first hymn for services at the Jesuit-administered parish at Barangka, Marikina, with the intent that it could be easily sung and learnt by ordinary Filipinos. This brought about the tradition of Filipino popular hymnody which was later labelled "Jesuit Music".

His more famous hymns include a setting for the Tagalog text of the Gloria, "Papuri sa Diyos", "Magnificat (Ang Puso Ko'y Nagpupuri)", "Maria, Bukang-Liwayway" (lit. "Mary, Dawn"), "Pananagutan" ("Responsibility"), among many others. His works have been published and sung in many parishes in the Philippines and in other countries as well; his "Papuri" has been sung at St. Peter's Basilica in Rome. His publisher is the Ateneo-based Jesuit Music Ministry.

Illness and death
Fr. Honti suffered a stroke in 1991, affecting his mobility and ability to communicate. On 4 January 2008, he was found lying unconscious in a hallway of the Loyola House of Studies in Quezon City and physicians later determined that he had suffered another stroke. He was pronounced dead on 15 January 2008, and among the attendees at his funeral on 19 January were President Gloria Macapagal Arroyo, who presented a posthumous award for his work.

Gallery

Awards
1976 - Tanglaw ng Lahi Awards (Ateneo de Manila University)
1992 - Asian Catholic Publisher's Outstanding Catholic Author Award
2000 - Pro Ecclesia et Pontifice
2008 - Presidential Medal of Merit (posthumous)

See also
Jesuit Music Ministry - Fr. Hontiveros's publisher
Bukas Palad Music Ministry
Hangad

References

External links
 Fr. Hontiveros' obituary and biography from the official Philippine Province of the Society of Jesus website
 GMA pays tribute to Fr. Hontiveros- News report from Philstar
 Homily during Fr. Hontiveros' Funeral Mass
 Fr. Eduardo Hontiveros S.J. (By Teodoro Bacani Jr.)

1923 births
2008 deaths
Ateneo de Manila University alumni
Academic staff of Ateneo de Manila University
20th-century Filipino Jesuits
People from Iloilo City
Recipients of the Presidential Medal of Merit (Philippines)
Classical composers of church music
Male classical composers
Visayan people
Jesuit musicians
20th-century male musicians